Yisrael Peled (born October 2, 1921; died July 14, 2016) was an Israeli politician who served as the second mayor of Ramat Gan between 1969 and 1983.

Biography

Yisrael Feldman (later Peled) was born in Tel Aviv during the Mandate era. He was the grandson of Haim Dov and Rivka Feldman, who were among the founders of Rosh Pinna. He  married Miriam Haya Rivlin, with whom he had five children.
After serving in the Israeli Defense Forces, he moved to Ramat Gan and worked as a lawyer.

Political and public career
In 1959 Ramat Gan mayor Avraham Krinitzi asked him to run on the  General Zionist list in the city council elections. After the death of Krinitzi in 1969, he was chosen to replace Krinitzi in the mayor's office. He served as mayor of Ramat Gan for three successive terms.
Among the projects established and promoted at the time: Safari Ayalon Mall and Diamond Exchange District.

In 1973–1986, Peled served as chairman of the Maccabi World Union, chairman of the organizing committee and chairman of three Maccabiah Games. He was also a member of the World Zionist Organization and the Jewish Agency.

References

1921 births
2016 deaths
Mayors of Ramat Gan
Israeli Jews
People from Tel Aviv
Jews in Mandatory Palestine
Israeli lawyers
General Zionists politicians